William H. Clothier, A.S.C. (February 21, 1903 – January 7, 1996) was an American cinematographer.

Biography

Born in Decatur, Illinois, Clothier entered the film industry painting sets at Warner Bros., and at the end of the silent era began photographing such films as Wings (1927) and Ernst Lubitsch's The Patriot (1928). Between 1933 and 1938, he worked in Spain, where he was imprisoned during the Spanish Civil War. He was a lieutenant colonel in the United States Air Force during World War II, during which he flew seventeen missions on the Memphis Belle.

In 1955, Clothier filmed The Sea Chase, his first project as Director of Photography with John Wayne, after which the actor signed him to a contract with his Batjac Productions. The two went on to collaborate on 21 more films, including John Ford's The Man Who Shot Liberty Valance. He retired in 1972 after filming The Train Robbers for Burt Kennedy.

Clothier was nominated for two Academy Awards for Best Cinematography for The Alamo (1960) and Cheyenne Autumn (1964). His work on numerous Westerns earned him the 1973 Heritage Award from the Cowboy Hall of Fame, and he received the American Society of Cinematographers President's Award in 1995.

Filmography

Cinematographer 

 with Archie Stout.

Other 

 Originally filmed in 1949 but not released until 1957.

TV 
 Cheyenne - episode - Fury at Rio Hondo - Director of Photography (1956)
 Gang Busters - 4 episodes - Director of Photography (1952-1955)

Misc.
 The Hollywood Greats - episode - John Wayne - Himself (1984)
 John Wayne's The Alamo - Video Documentary - Himself (1992)

References

External links

William H. Clothier at FilmReference.com

American cinematographers
1903 births
1996 deaths
Burials at Forest Lawn Memorial Park (Hollywood Hills)